Salagena charlottae is a moth in the family Cossidae. It is found in Kenya, where it has been recorded from Gogoni Forest. The habitat consists of legume-dominated lowland coastal forests.

Description
The length of the forewings is about 7.5 mm. The forewings are pale orange-yellow, with streaks along the costal margin and crescent-shaped dots along the distal margin which are the same colour. There are streaks of antique brown on the whole upper side with small blackish streaks and dots, as well as a row of three to five small blackish dots near the apex. The hindwings are mouse-grey.

Etymology
The species is named for Charlotte Marie-Johanna Haberland, the grandmother of the author.

References

 Natural History Museum Lepidoptera generic names catalog

Endemic moths of Kenya
Metarbelinae
Moths described in 2008